The 1979–80 Liga Artzit season saw Hapoel Jerusalem win the title and win promotion to Liga Leumit. Hapoel Ramat Gan and Hapoel Rishon LeZion were also promoted.

Hapoel Bat Yam, Hapoel Tirat HaCarmel and Hapoel Herzliya were all relegated to Liga Alef.

Final table

References
The Artzit table Maariv, 11.5.80, Historical Jewish Press 

Liga Artzit seasons
Israel
2